Halton-with-Aughton is a civil parish in Lancaster, Lancashire, England. It contains 46 listed buildings that are recorded in the National Heritage List for England.  Of these, one is listed at Grade I, the highest of the three grades, three are at Grade II*, the middle grade, and the others are at Grade II, the lowest grade.

The parish is in the Lune Valley to the east of Lancaster, and contains the village of Halton-on-Lune and the settlement of Aughton.  Much of the parish is rural.  Most of the listed buildings are houses and associated structures, and farmhouses and farm buildings.  The Midland Railway, its lines now disused, passed through the parish, and two of its bridges are listed.  Passing through the western extremity of the parish is the Lancaster Canal, and an aqueduct and a bridge associated with this are listed.  The other listed buildings include a church and associated structures, a mausoleum, a public house, and a bridge over the River Lune.

Key

Buildings

References

Citations

Sources

Lists of listed buildings in Lancashire
Buildings and structures in the City of Lancaster